The Cabinet of the Confederate States, commonly called the Confederate cabinet or Cabinet of Jefferson Davis, was part of the executive branch of the federal government of the Confederate States between 1861 and 1865. The members of the Cabinet were the vice-president and heads of the federal executive departments.

History
 
The cabinet was largely modeled on the Cabinet of the United States, with its members overseeing a State Department, Treasury Department, War Department, and Post Office Department. However, unlike the Union, the Confederacy lacked a Department of the Interior, and created a Justice Department (the position of the U.S. Attorney General existed, but the U.S. Department of Justice was only created in 1870, after the end of the Civil War).

Confederate President Jefferson Davis made many of his initial selections to the Cabinet on the basis of political considerations; his choices "Were dictated by the need to assure the various states that their interests were being represented in the government." Moreover, much Confederate talent went into the military rather than the Cabinet, and the cabinet suffered from frequent turnover and reshuffling. Sixteen different men served in the six Cabinet posts during the four years of the Confederacy's existence. The most talented—but also the most unpopular—member of the Cabinet was Judah P. Benjamin. Among the weakest cabinet secretaries was Treasury Secretary Christopher Memminger, who had little experience with fiscal policy; Memminger was placed at the Treasury by Davis due to the influence of South Carolinians, because Memminger had been an influential supporter of that state's secession. Civil War historian Allen C. Guelzo describes the first Confederate secretaries of war and state, Leroy Pope Walker of Alabama and Robert Toombs of Georgia, respectively—as "brainless political appointees."

The cabinet's performance suffered due to Davis's inability to delegate and propensity to micromanage his Cabinet officers. Davis consulted with the Cabinet frequently—meeting with individual cabinet secretaries almost every day and convening meetings of the full Cabinet two or three times a week—but these meetings, which could stretch to five hours or more, "rarely saw anything accomplished." Secretary of the Navy Stephen Mallory lamented that "From [Davis's] uncontrollable tendency to digression," cabinet meetings "consumed four or five hours without determining anything." Many of the cabinet members became frustrated, especially the secretaries of war; after concluding "that they could not get along with Davis's constant interference and micromanagement," many resigned. Nine of the eleven Confederate states "had representation in the Cabinet at some point during the life of Confederacy"; only Tennessee and Arkansas never had a Confederate cabinet officer.

The final meeting of the Confederate cabinet took place in Fort Mill, South Carolina, amid the Confederate collapse. Fort Mill was the only place where the full Confederate cabinet met after the fall of Richmond.

Cabinet

See also

Rufus Randolph Rhodes the only head of the Confederate Patent Office

References

External links

 
1861 establishments in the Confederate States of America
1865 disestablishments in the Confederate States of America